Hakea polyanthema is a species of flowering plant in the family Proteacea that is endemic to Western Australia. It is a shrub with needle-shaped leaves and small groups of small unpleasantly scented flowers in leaf axils.

Description
The new leaves and branchlets are covered with rusty coloured flattened, short, silky hairs. The leaves may be either curving or straight and end in a sharp upright point. The inflorescences consists of 2, 4 or 6 small white, pink or deep red flowers in leaf axils.
Flowering occurs from August to September.

Taxonomy and naming
Hakea polyanthema  was first formally described in 1904 by Ludwig Diels as part of the work by Diels and Ernst Georg Pritzel and published in  Botanische Jahrbücher für Systematik, Pflanzengeschichte und Pflanzengeographie. The specific epithet polyanthema is taken from the Greek poly- meaning "many", and anthemon meaning "flower", possibly in reference to the apparent density of the flowers.

Distribution and habitat
This species is endemic to a small area on the west coast, Mid West and the Wheatbelt regions of Western Australia between Geraldton and Dandaragan.  It grows in sandy soils, loam and gravel in scrubland and heath.

References

polyanthema
Eudicots of Western Australia
Plants described in 1904
Taxa named by Ludwig Diels